The Oyster Rock Lighthouse is located in Karwar, Karnataka, India, on one of the islands located close to Karwar, Oyster Rock. Tourists can reach this island with the help of motor boats, which are available from Karwar Port. Constructed by the British during the 1860s, the lighthouse became functional from 25 March 1864.

The tower has a dome on the top, from where the entrance to the lantern room can be seen. The lantern was painted white rather than orange or red, in order to make the sunrise and sunset more apparent.

See also 

 List of lighthouses in India

References

External links 
 
 Directorate General of Lighthouses and Lightships

Lighthouses completed in 1864
Lighthouses in India
Transport in Uttara Kannada district
Buildings and structures in Uttara Kannada district
Tourist attractions in Uttara Kannada district
1864 establishments in India
Transport in Karwar